Herschel Vincent Forester (April 14, 1931 – December 31, 2018) was a professional American football offensive lineman in the  National Football League. He played four seasons for the Cleveland Browns (1954–1957).

References

1931 births
2018 deaths
Players of American football from Dallas
American football offensive guards
SMU Mustangs football players
Cleveland Browns players